The Ethnographic Museum of Dairy is a museum in the village of La Foz, Morcín, Asturias, Spain. Founded in 1993, the museum collects, studies and publicizes the various aspects of science and technology of milk and dairy derivatives, as well as traditional agricultural practices and customs. Containing more than 500 display pieces, the museum is divided into four thematic sections: livestock, milk, butter, and cheese. Its facilities include an audiovisual room, a specialized library and a documentary archive. The museum also has a reproduction of a blue cheese maturation cave. A member of the Ethnographic Museums Network of Asturias, it is open seven days a week.

See also

 List of food and beverage museums

References

Museums in Asturias
Ethnographic museums in Spain
Museums established in 1993
Food and drink museums
Agriculture museums in Spain
Dairy organizations
Agricultural organisations based in Spain